Chah Murtuni (also Romanized as Chāh Mūrtūnī; also known as Chāh-i-Mortuni, Chāh Morten, Chāh Mūrtīn, and Chāh Mūrtīnī) is a village in Khvormiz Rural District, in the Central District of Mehriz County, Yazd Province, Iran. At the 2006 census, its population was 19, in 8 families.

References 

Populated places in Mehriz County